Maliheh-ye Sadun (also Romanized as Malīḩeh-ye Sa‘dūn; also known as Malīḩeh-ye Do) is a village in Jahad Rural District, Hamidiyeh District, Ahvaz County, Khuzestan Province, Iran. At the 2006 census, its population was 321, in 53 families.

References 

Populated places in Ahvaz County